Barood is a 1976 Indian Bollywood action crime film directed by Pramod Chakravorty, with screenplay by Sachin Bhowmick and dialogues by Ahsan Rizvi. It stars Rishi Kapoor, Reena Roy and Shoma Anand in leading roles, with Dharmendra, Hema Malini and Ashok Kumar in supporting roles. The film was a commercial flop in India, but went on to become an overseas blockbuster in the Soviet Union.

Cast
 Rishi Kapoor as Anup D. "Pappu" Saxena
 Reena Roy as Sapna, Bakshi's assistant 
 Shoma Anand as Seema Bakshi
 Dharmendra as Anup's Land lord
 Hema Malini as Anup's Land lady
 Ashok Kumar as Balraj Gupta, Criminologist
 Ajit as Bakshi
 Prem Chopra as Prem, Bakshi's Madrid associate
 Madan Puri as B. Puri – Bakshi's New York associate
 Sujit Kumar as Ratan – Bakshi's Las Vegas Associate
 Asrani as Hari Ramchandani / Harry Ramani – Veterinary surgeon

Music
"Dil Kaanto Mein Uljahaya Hai, Ek DushmanPe Pyar Aaya" – Lata Mangeshkar
"Samundar Samundar Yaha Se Waha Tak Ye Maujo Ki" – Lata Mangeshkar
"I Love You" – Asha Bhosle
"Bada Hi Khubsurat Is Jagah Ka Har Nazara Hai" – Kishore Kumar
"Tu Shaitano Ka Sardar Hai Sach Hai" – Shivangi Kolhapure, Mukesh

Production
It is claimed to be an uncredited remake of the 1972 Italian/Spanish/English film The Summertime Killer starring Christopher Mitchum and Olivia Hussey.

Box office

At the domestic Indian box office in 1976, Barood grossed 2 crore, with a net income of 1 crore. While it was the 17th highest-grossing film in India that year, it was declared a commercial flop in the domestic Indian market.

Despite its domestic failure an India, the film went on to become an overseas blockbuster in the Soviet Union, where it released in 1978 and topped the year's Soviet box office chart. It drew a box office audience of 60 million Soviet viewers, the second highest for an Indian film in the 1970s (after the earlier Rishi Kapoor starrer Bobby) and the fifth highest for a foreign film that decade. At the Soviet box office, it was the 13th biggest hit of the 1970s, the fourth most successful Indian import of all time (after Awaara, Bobby and Disco Dancer), the ninth biggest foreign hit of all time, and one of the top 30 biggest hits of all time. It was among the highest-grossing films in the Soviet Union.

See also
List of highest-grossing Indian films
List of highest-grossing Indian films in overseas markets
List of Soviet films of the year by ticket sales

Notes

References

External links

1970s Hindi-language films
1970s crime action films
1976 films
Indian crime action films
Indian remakes of Italian films
Indian remakes of Spanish films
Indian films about revenge
Films scored by S. D. Burman
1970s Urdu-language films
Films shot in New York City
Films shot in Paris
Films shot in Delhi
Films shot in Switzerland
Films directed by Pramod Chakravorty
Urdu-language Indian films